PacWest Center is a 30-story,  office skyscraper in Portland, Oregon. The building was designed by Hugh Stubbins & Associates of Cambridge, Massachusetts, and completed in 1984.

History
Construction of PacWest Center began in October 1982, and the  building was formally dedicated on November 1, 1984. The building's name is derived from former anchor tenant, Pacific Western Bank of Oregon, owned by PacWest Bancorp. However, PacWest's Oregon operations were acquired by KeyCorp in 1986 and became part of KeyBank. Tokyo-based Mitsubishi Estate Co. had been the majority owner in the building since it rose in 1984.

In 1985, the building's design won its architects, Hugh Stubbins & Associates and Skidmore, Owings & Merrill, the year's top "honor award" from the Portland chapter of the American Institute of Architects. The building's lobby was remodeled in 2002. In December 2007 the building was sold to Ashforth Pacific Inc. for $161.5 million. During a windstorm in December 2014 a piece of sheet metal blew off from the tower and damaged the neighboring Standard Plaza. Ashforth sold the PacWest Center in 2016 for $170 million to LPC Realty Advisors I LP.

Details
The modern, metallic look of the building comes from the use of aluminum panels imported from Japan. Law firm Schwabe, Williamson & Wyatt is one of the largest tenants, occupying the 15th to 19th floors. The firm has been based in the building since 1984.

See also
Architecture of Portland, Oregon
List of tallest buildings in Portland, Oregon

References

External links

 PacWest Center official website

Office buildings completed in 1984
Skyscraper office buildings in Portland, Oregon
1984 establishments in Oregon
Skidmore, Owings & Merrill buildings